Dai is a minor Austronesian language spoken on Dai Island in South Maluku, Indonesia.

References 

Babar languages
Languages of the Maluku Islands